5381 Sekhmet is an Aten asteroid whose orbit is sometimes closer to the Sun than the Earth's. Carolyn Shoemaker at Palomar Observatory discovered it on 14 May 1991. It is named after Sekhmet, the Egyptian goddess of war.

Sekhmet is believed to be an S-type asteroid, and some believe its diameter is approximately 1.4 km.

In December 2003, a team of astronomers at Arecibo Observatory announced that the asteroid may have a moon that measures 300 m in diameter and orbits approximately 1.5 km from Sekhmet. This moon is not yet confirmed.

References

External links 
 (5381) Sekhmet, datasheet, johnstonsarchive.net
 Asteroids with Satellites, Robert Johnston, johnstonsarchive.net
 
 
 

005381
Discoveries by Carolyn S. Shoemaker
Named minor planets
005381
005381
19910514